Anspach is a surname. Notable people with the surname include:

Eugène Anspach (1833–1890), Belgian lawyer and civil servant
Frederick Rinehart Anspach (1815–1867), American Lutheran clergyman, writer and editor
Henri Anspach (1882–1979), Belgian épée (Olympic champion) and foil fencer
Jules Anspach (1829–1879), Belgian politician
Paul Anspach (1882–1991), Belgian épée and foil fencer, two-time Olympic champion
Ralph Anspach (1926–2022), American economics professor
Sólveig Anspach (1960–2015), Icelandic-French film director and screenwriter
Susan Anspach (1942–2018), American stage and motion picture actress

See also 

 Anspach family

German toponymic surnames